Fabian Gotthard von Steinheil (tr. ; 14 October 1762 – 23 February 1831) was a Baltic German who served as a Russian military officer and the Governor-General of Finland between 1810 and 1824.

Steinheil was born in Hapsal, Estonia. His father's family was from region of Upper Rhine in Germany (where they had been burghers and officials of their hometowns); and his mother was from a cadet branch of the ancient Baltic House of Tiesenhausen, daughter of nobleman Fromhold Fabian Tiesenhausen, lord of Orina in Estonia. Stenheil's uncle and father had received a baronial title from the imperial authorities.

Fabian von Steinheil became a lieutenant in the Imperial Russian Army in 1782. He took part in the war in Finland in 1788 and in 1791-92 he worked with construction of fortifications in Old Finland, after which he served in military cartography.

He became a Major General in 1789 and took part in the campaigns in Prussia in 1806-1807 and Poland in 1805-1807. He became a Lieutenant General in 1807 and commanded the Russian troops on Åland in 1809 during the Finnish War.

In 1810 he was appointed as the Governor-General of Finland, to succeed Michael Andreas Barclay de Tolly. He was well regarded by the Finnish population and was made a count in 1812. In 1813 he took part in the war against Napoleon as the commander of an army in Courland and Livonia, and was succeeded as Governor-General by the influential Count Gustaf Mauritz Armfelt. However, due to Armfelt's fragile health, Steinheil soon returned to the post of Governor-General which he held to 1824, being then succeeded by Count Arseniy Zakrevskiy.

He remained in Finland and died in Helsinki in 1831.

Honours and awards
 Knight of the Order of St. Alexander Nevsky
Order of Saint Anna, 1st class
Order of St. Vladimir, 2nd class
Gold Sword for Bravery
Order of St. George, 3rd class
 Order of St. George, 4th class
Order of the Red Eagle 1st Class

|-

1762 births
1831 deaths
Baltic-German people
Governors of the Grand Duchy of Finland
Imperial Russian Army generals
People from the Governorate of Estonia
Russian commanders of the Napoleonic Wars
Recipients of the Order of St. George of the Third Degree